Wolves of Wall Street is a 2002 American horror film directed by David DeCoteau.

Plot
On the advice of a bartender familiar with the Wall Street crowd, Jeff Allen (William Gregory Lee) applies to the Wolfe Brothers brokerage firm in New York City for his dream job as a stock broker. What he does not know is that the brokers are werewolves, and he is bitten, thus he "joins the pack". He is forced to abandon his love and values for cunning and instinct during which time he cheats on his girlfriend, Annabella, and brutally kills and eats various humans. After a change of heart, he finds that leaving the brotherhood is harder than joining.

Jeff goes to Annabella's friend's birthday party, and a drunk tries hitting on Annabella. Jeff rips a piece out of the neck of the drunk and then chases his girlfriend back to her apartment and bites her, transforming her into a werewolf too. Annabella had given him a silver pen when he first started as an intern at the Wolfe Brothers firm, and he goes back to the headquarters and he tries to quit, but his mentor, Dyson Keller, refuses to let him go. Jeff leaves anyway, but the werewolves led by Vince, go to Annabelle's apartment and seize her. They force him to return to headquarters, and he stabs the person he thought was the alpha but he was wrong, and a fight ensues during which he and his girlfriend kill all of the werewolves, and then they start walking away. The alpha who they thought they had killed, opens his eyes a split second before the end of the film, showing that they were not successful.

Cast
 Jeff Branson as Tyler
William Gregory Lee as Jeff Allen
Elisa Donovan as Annabella Morris
Michael Bergin as Vince
Jason-Shane Scott as Meeks
Bradley Stryker as Kennison
Louise Lasser as the Landlady
Eric Roberts as Dyson Keller

Production

Reception

Release

References

External links
 
 
 

2002 films
2002 horror films
2002 LGBT-related films
American LGBT-related films
Films scored by Harry Manfredini
Films directed by David DeCoteau
Films set in New York City
LGBT-related horror films
2000s monster movies
Wall Street films
American werewolf films
2000s English-language films
2000s American films